Pantea Arteshbod (fl. 539 BC), was a Persian Lieutenant Commander. She served in the army of Cyrus the Great.

She played an important role in the Battle of Opis in 539 BCE. She also assisted her husband in the formation of the 10,000 'Persian Immortals'. She was not the only woman to serve in the army, as the Lieutenant Commander Artunis (c. 500–540 BC), daughter of general Artebaz, also served in the army of Cyrus (or alternatively Darius I). They are often put forward as representative of other female Ancient Persians soldiers, as it is known that women could serve in the Ancient Persian army.

References

6th-century BC births
6th-century BC deaths
Women in ancient warfare
Women in war in the Middle East
Women of the Achaemenid Empire
6th-century BC women
6th-century BC Iranian people